The discography of UB40, a British reggae band, consists of 20 studio albums, 17 compilation albums, seven live albums, two remix albums, 63 singles and a number of appearances with other artists.

The band has sold over 100 million records worldwide. Their biggest hits include "Red Red Wine" (1983), "(I Can't Help) Falling in Love with You" (1993) and "I Got You Babe" (1985).

Albums

Studio albums

Compilation albums

Live albums

Remix albums

Singles

1980s

1990s

2000s–2020s

Collaboration singles

As featured artist

Notes

References

External links
UB40 official web site
UB40 at Rolling Stone
UB40 discography at Discogs

Discographies of British artists
Reggae discographies